C2 is a super-yacht built in 2008 at the shipyard Abeking & Rasmussen. The interior and exterior design of C2 was done by Reymond Langton Design Ltd. The yacht has three sister-ships, Ameryllis, Eminence and Titan.

Design 
The materials of the hull is Steel, with the superstructure made out of aluminium. The yacht is Lloyd's registered, issued by Cayman Islands.The yacht can accommodate up to 22 passengers.

Engines 
The main engines are two Caterpillar Inc. 3516 DITA with a power of  each.

See also 
 Amaryllis
 Eminence
 Titan
 Motor yacht
 List of motor yachts by length
 List of yachts built by Abeking & Rasmussen

References

2008 ships
Motor yachts
Ships built in Germany
Individual yachts